Kenyi Fernando Adachi García (born 19 January 1993) is a Mexican professional footballer who currently plays for Real Burgos CF. He is of Japanese descent.

References

1993 births
Living people
Place of birth missing (living people)
Mexican people of Japanese descent
Mexican footballers
Santos Laguna footballers
Real Burgos CF footballers
Mexican expatriate footballers
Expatriate footballers in Spain
Mexican expatriate sportspeople in Spain
Association football defenders